Lewis Clayton (7 June 1924 – 19 January 2010) was an English professional footballer who played as a wing half. He made over 150 appearances in The Football League during spells with Barnsley, Carlisle United, Queens Park Rangers, Bournemouth and Boscombe Athletic and Swindon Town.

After retiring from playing, he worked for several Football League sides in various roles, including a one-match spell as caretaker-manager of Cardiff City in November 1973.

Playing career
Born in Royston, West Riding of Yorkshire, Clayton began playing football for Barnsley during the Second World War. He worked as a miner during the war on weekdays before playing football on weekends. He left Barnsley to join Carlisle United in March 1946 where he made his league debut before returning to Barnsley the following year. He later played for Queens Park Rangers, Bournemouth and Boscombe Athletic and Swindon Town before moving into non- league football with Wisbech Town.

Later career

After finishing his playing career Clayton remained in football, working in several roles for Cambridge United and Doncaster Rovers. Clayton later worked for Cardiff City and was briefly appointed caretaker-manager of the side following Jimmy Scoular's dismissal in November 1973. He took charge of a single match, a 2–0 defeat to Millwall, before Frank O'Farrell was appointed. He then moved to Middlesbrough FC as physio under John Neal in 1977

Personal life
Clayton retired to the village of Redcarwith wife Joyce. He had one daughter Christine and one granddaughter Sarah. He died on 19 January 2010.

Managerial statistics

<small>Source:

References

1924 births
2010 deaths
People from Royston, South Yorkshire
English footballers
Barnsley F.C. players
Carlisle United F.C. players
Queens Park Rangers F.C. players
AFC Bournemouth players
Swindon Town F.C. players
Wisbech Town F.C. players
English Football League players
Association football wing halves
English football managers
Cardiff City F.C. managers
Cambridge United F.C. non-playing staff
Doncaster Rovers F.C. non-playing staff
English miners